Mel Ayanambakkam Lake is one of the clean water lake in Chennai district's locality Mel Ayanambakkam near Thiruverkadu. This lake is also an important water source for the metropolitan areas of Chennai city.

References

Lakes of Chennai